Oskar Gerber (born 1919) was a Swiss athlete. He competed in the men's decathlon at the 1948 Summer Olympics.

References

External links
 

1919 births
Possibly living people
Athletes (track and field) at the 1948 Summer Olympics
Swiss decathletes
Olympic athletes of Switzerland
Place of birth missing